Vetri Karangal is a 1991 Indian Tamil-language action film directed by R. Krishnamoorthy, starring Prabhu, Prem Menon, Rupini and Sadhana. It was released on 15 March 1991.

Plot

Cast 
Prabhu
Prem Menon
Rupini
Sadhana as Radha/Kalpana (dual role)
Vijayakumar as Thyagarajan
Manjula Vijayakumar as Lakshmi
Vinu Chakravarthy
Radha Ravi
V. K. Ramasamy
Senthil

Soundtrack 
The music was composed by Ilaiyaraaja.

Reception 
C. R. K. of Kalki criticised the film for the story, which they felt was not well developed.

References

External links 
 

1990s Tamil-language films
1991 films
Films scored by Ilaiyaraaja
Films directed by R. Krishnamoorthy